The Hobgoblin is the alias of several supervillains appearing in American comic books published by Marvel Comics, most of whom are depicted as enemies of the superhero Spider-Man and belong to the collection of adversaries that make up his rogues gallery.

The first and most prominent incarnation of the Hobgoblin made his in-costume debut in The Amazing Spider-Man #238 in March 1983 as a criminal mastermind equipped with Halloween-themed weapons similar to those used by the Green Goblin.  His civilian identity was initially kept unknown, and was a major mystery in the Spider-Man universe.  In 1987, it was established that Peter Parker's journalist co-worker Ned Leeds was the true identity of the first Hobgoblin.  Ten years later in 1997, the first Hobgoblin's true identity was retroactively changed to be Roderick Kingsley instead.  Ned Leeds was later resurrected and re-introduced to the Marvel universe in 2021, and a 2022 storyline reestablished Leeds to have been one of the original Hobgoblins before having him assume the mantle again. Other characters that have assumed the Hobgoblin persona over the years include Lefty Donovan, Jason Macendale, Roderick's twin brother Daniel Kingsley, Robin Borne, Phil Urich, and Claude. Leeds, Donovan and Claude served as brainwashed stand-ins as part of a complicated villainous scheme by the Kingsley brothers', with Macendale, Borne, and Urich being the only versions to operate independently of the others (although occasionally partnering with them), the latter after killing Daniel Kingsley.

The Hobgoblin has been adapted from the comics into various forms of media including television series and video games, most notably in the 1994–1998 Spider-Man: The Animated Series where he was voiced by Mark Hamill.

Publication history

The Hobgoblin was created by writer Roger Stern and artist John Romita Jr. for The Amazing Spider-Man #238 (March 1983). Like other writers, Stern found himself under pressure to have Spider-Man fight the Green Goblin again, but did not wish to bring Norman Osborn or Bart Hamilton back from the dead, have Harry Osborn be the Green Goblin again, or create another Green Goblin. Stern instead created a new concept as heir to the Goblin legacy and developed the Hobgoblin. Stern recounts that he directed Romita to base the costume on the Green Goblin's but to make it "a little more medieval-looking", while Romita asserts that he was given no direction beyond using the Green Goblin as a basis. Both agree, however, that the costume was chiefly Romita's design.

The Hobgoblin's identity was not initially revealed, generating one of the longest-running mysteries in the Spider-Man comics. According to Stern, "I plotted that first story with no strong idea of who the Hobgoblin was. As I was scripting those gorgeous pages from [John Romita, Jr.], particularly the last third of the book, and developing the Hobgoblin’s speech pattern, I realized who he was. It was Roderick Kingsley, that sunuvabitch corporate leader I had introduced in my first issue of [The] Spectacular [Spider-Man]." A handful of readers deduced that Kingsley was the Hobgoblin almost immediately. To throw off the scent and in the same stroke provide a retroactive explanation for Kingsley's inconsistent characterization in his early appearances, Stern came up with the idea of Kingsley having his brother Daniel Kingsley sometimes impersonate him, sealing the deception by having the Hobgoblin conspicuously appear in the same room as Kingsley in The Amazing Spider-Man #249.

Stern's original plan was to have the Hobgoblin's mystery identity run exactly one issue longer than that of the Green Goblin's identity, meaning the truth would be revealed in The Amazing Spider-Man #264. However, Stern left after The Amazing Spider-Man #251, and editor Tom DeFalco took his place. Wanting to resolve the mystery in a manner that would do justice to Stern's stories, DeFalco asked Stern who the Hobgoblin was, but objected when Stern said it was Kingsley. DeFalco argued that the "twin brother" scheme was cheating the readers since there had been no hint that Roderick even had a brother (aside from a single thought bubble), much less one who could serve as a body double. Stern disagreed but said that DeFalco should feel free to make the choice of which character to use for the Hobgoblin's secret identity, Stern reasoning that "I knew that whomever Tom chose, he would make it work." Upon reviewing the clues, DeFalco decided that the Hobgoblin was Richard Fisk. Moreover, he decided that the Hobgoblin's mystery should be prolonged as long as possible, since it was the chief element that made the Hobgoblin interesting. Through both Stern and DeFalco's runs, the answer was continuously teased on the cover art, with the covers of The Amazing Spider-Man #245, 251, and 276 all showing Spider-Man having unmasked the Hobgoblin.

The mystery was further complicated after James Owsley came on as editor of the Spider-Man titles. Owsley's relationship with DeFalco and artist Ron Frenz was strained from the beginning. When Owsley asked who the Hobgoblin was at a creators conference, DeFalco lied and said the man in question was Ned Leeds. Owsley then wrote the one-shot Spider-Man vs Wolverine in which Leeds is killed off (though the actual death is not shown), and instructed The Spectacular Spider-Man writer Peter David to reveal the Hobgoblin's identity as the Foreigner. David objected and argued that the only person who fit the clues was Leeds. Having been present at the Spider-Man creator's conference, David also thought that Leeds was who DeFalco intended it to be. Because Spider-Man vs. Wolverine had already been drawn, however, it was too late to undo Leeds's death. Thus, the Hobgoblin's identity was revealed posthumously in the double-sized The Amazing Spider-Man #289. With Spider-Man's archenemy now dead, a new storyline was created from Jason Macendale's hatred of the Hobgoblin. Though the Hobgoblin's posthumous unmasking as Leeds was unpopular with fans, David said in a 2009 interview of still being proud of the story, arguing that the Hobgoblin being unmasked in a climactic battle with Spider-Man was the sort of tale readers had already seen countless times before, whereas having an archvillain unmasked in a flashback after having been brutally killed by nameless assassins was unprecedented and shocking. From 1987 to 1997, Macendale initially using only the Hobgoblin's costume and weaponry, but the 1988-1989 "Inferno" crossover writer Gerry Conway had Macendale imbued with magical powers by the demon N'astirh. In addition to power over hellfire and increased strength and speed far greater than his predecessor, N'astirh also disfigures Macendale so that his head resembled the Hobgoblin mask, and ultimately alters his mind so that he was deluded into thinking that his appearance is normal. Several years later, Macendale succeeds in purging himself of his demonic powers and acquires cybernetic implants.

Stern was unhappy with the Hobgoblin's civilian identity revelation was Leeds and wrote the three-issue miniseries Spider-Man: Hobgoblin Lives in 1997, with the retcon that Kingsley was the original Hobgoblin while Leeds was brainwashed into serving as a fall guy, Macendale is killed off, and Kingsley returned. According to Stern, initially he had not known how to resolve the situation of having two Hobgoblins, and it was at the suggestion of the editorial staff that Kingsley kill Macendale and return to operating as the Hobgoblin. Despite this, in a further 2021–2022 storyline by Zeb Wells, John Romita Jr., Scott Hanna, Marcio Menyz, and Joe Caramagna, Leeds is re-retconned to have been acting as a Hobgoblin on his own accord, willingly partnering with Kingsley, before assuming the mantle again after being resurrected.

Fictional character biography

Roderick Kingsley

Roderick Kingsley is an egotistical socialite and billionaire fashion designer. He decided to create a criminal name for himself by altering Norman Osborn's Goblin formula and improve the Goblin costume/equipment to be the original Hobgoblin. Kingsley then frames Ned Leeds as a decoy for his crimes, and later murders his successor Jason Macendale. When his villainous identity is finally exposed by Spider-Man and Betty Brant, he flees to the Caribbean to hide from both the law and his enemies. After his twin brother is murdered by Phil Urich, Roderick returns to New York and dons his old Hobgoblin costume.

Ned Leeds

Edward "Ned" Leeds was a reporter working for the Daily Bugle. In a 1987, he is revealed to be the first Hobgoblin, before being murdered by the Foreigner. Ten years later in 1997, Leeds is retroactively established to have been brainwashed by Roderick Kingsley to act as a stand-in on many occasions and fool the underworld into thinking that he was the Hobgoblin, before Kingsley took back over the role. On Leeds' resurrection in 2021, he was again retroactively reestablished to have been one of the original Hobgoblins in a 2022 storyline, assuming the mantle again, sharing it with Kingsley.

Lefty Donovan
Arnold Samuel "Lefty" Donovan was a petty thug. Similar to Osborn, Donovan was a test subject mix the two vital chemicals that were mixed into the Goblin formula, disfiguring Donovan's face and granting superhuman abilities. Donovan is taken to a hospital. Brainwashed by Gerhard Winkler's device, Donovan eventually escapes the hospital and follows preprogrammed instructions to go to a hidden cache of Goblin weapons and dress up as the Hobgoblin. Donovan (impersonating the Hobgoblin) attacks New York City but Spider-Man eventually confronts and unmasks him. Spider-Man sees his (scarred) face and recognizes Lefty. As Donovan is able to shake off some of his programing and starts talking, his "boss" programmed the Goblin glider to crash into the side of a building, killing Lefty instantly on impact.

Jason Macendale

Jason Philip Macendale Jr. was a mercenary who had been trained by the CIA (and various para-military organizations). He first appeared as the supervillain Jack O'Lantern before eventually adopting the Hobgoblin identity.

Daniel Kingsley
Daniel Kingsley is Roderick Kingsley's twin brother. He would act as a body double until being exposed by Betty Brant while the true Hobgoblin gets unmasked by Spider-Man. Now in protective custody, Daniel was unknowingly used by Roderick to blackmail Norman Osborn, resulting in the Hobgoblin to swoop in to collect Daniel. Spider-Man defends Daniel but is drugged while Daniel passes out and both are taken to Osborn. As Kingsley and Osborn furiously fight each other, Daniel gets rescued by Spider-Man. Kingsley later returned to New York, posing as his twin brother as the Hobgoblin. Kingsley investigated an old lair at OsCorp which had a flaming energy sword, but discovers Phil Urich trying to retrieve the same gear. Kingsley gets stunned by Urich's "Lunatic Laugh" long enough for Urich to kill him using his own sword, allowing his killer to claim the Hobgoblin mantle.

Phil Urich

Phillip Benjamin "Phil" Urich (who once used the Green Goblin identity to operate as a superhero) took on the Hobgoblin identity himself as a supervillain with some new gear (new body armor, a winged jetpack, and a flaming energy sword).

Norman Osborn

Norman Osborn briefly impersonated the original Hobgoblin.

Claude
Claude was Roderick's butler who was sent in place and to talk like his master to distract the Goblin Nation. He fought against and was killed in battle by the Goblin Knight who then discovered it was Claude who was killed and destroyed his body to keep the Goblin King from finding out about the imposter Hobgoblin.

Powers, abilities, and equipment
As the Hobgoblin, Roderick Kingsley wears bulletproof mail with an overlapping tunic, cape, and cowl. A computerized system cybernetically causes the finger-blasters to randomly vary their attack vectors when trained on a particular target. He uses a Goblin glider, a one-man miniature turbo-fan-powered vertical thrust, cybernetically-controlled vehicle. It can reach high velocities and is extremely maneuverable. He uses concussion and incendiary Jack O'Lanterns, wraith-shaped smoke and gas-emitting bombs, bat shaped razor-edged throwing blades, and gloves woven with micro-circuited power conducting filaments which channel pulsed discharges of electricity. He wore a shoulder bag to carry his small, portable weaponry.

While brainwashed, Ned Leeds wore the Hobgoblin's uniform and used the Goblin glider and equipment which included Jack O'Lantern bombs, razor bats and electrical shock gloves. However, he had no healing factor or superhuman strength.

As the Hobgoblin, Phil Urich wears an orange Hobgoblin costume with wings on the back that allow him to fly without the use of a Goblin glider and he took the Hobgoblin mask as his own. He uses the traditional Pumpkin Bombs all Green Goblins and Hobgoblins before him have used, but he also has a new flaming sword. He still retains his "Lunatic Laugh" and he also has superhuman strength, speed, durability, stamina, reflexes and senses, and enhanced intellect. For unknown reasons, he no longer needs his Goblin mask to activate this power. With the help of Reverbium, his "Lunatic Laugh" was able to cause a building to collapse.

Alternative versions

Hobgoblin 2211

Hobgoblin 2211 first appears in Spider-Man 2099 Meets Spider-Man. While her costume sports the twentieth-century Green Goblins' green-and-purple color scheme, she boasted that she was the Hobgoblin of 2211. Her identity was not revealed to readers (or to the visiting Spider-Men of previous eras) at the time, but her later reappearance in Friendly Neighborhood Spider-Man (also written by David) revealed her true identity and origin.

Hobgoblin 2211 is Robin "Hobby"/"Hob" Borne, Spider-Man's daughter. Her father always seemed to put his superhero career before raising his own daughter. She wanted to save the universes from 'intersecting'; in other words, having other parallel universes merge with the existing one, causing it to override. She was later arrested by her father for something that she would have done in future: unauthorized time travel, chronal displacement, jumping the tracks to other realities. She was held in a virtual reality prison where she lives a benign and trouble-free existence in what appears to be Kansas. Her boyfriend attempts to free her by uploading a virus into the prison, but inadvertently causes her to be driven insane. She attacked her father with a 'retcon bomb' (a variation on the original Goblins' pumpkin bombs) but it hit her boyfriend instead, erasing (or 'retconning') him from existence.

Now suited up as the Hobgoblin, Robin managed to time-travel to the current year, attacking the current Spider-Man in his reality and derailing an Uncle Ben from another reality into the present one causing a time paradox. Later, in a confrontation with her father, she threw a 'retcon bomb' at him. Spider-Man, believing it to be no more harmful than a regular pumpkin bomb, caught it with his web and threw it back to Robin, unwittingly erasing her from existence.

JLA/Avengers
In the last issue of JLA/Avengers, the Hobgoblin is among the enthralled villains defending Krona's stronghold, and is defeated by Hawkgirl.

Marvel Adventures
In this continuity, Hobgoblin is an unidentified criminal who found a stash of Green Goblin's weaponry because he had forgotten to leave the entrance locked. Delighted at his new technological power he challenges Green Goblin to a confrontation. Spider-Man defeats them both.

MC2
The original Hobgoblin made his MC2 debut as a hired assassin to kill many of the Spider-Girl characters, including Normie Osborn, Spider-Girl, and Peter Parker. After a fight against both Spider-Girl and her father, he came close to victory, but at the end his only success lay in killing the Venom symbiote, and also in escaping without a trace. He attempted a complex plot to become the new kingpin of crime, but was undone due to an act of treachery by his partner, the Mindworm. Killing the Mindworm, and deciding the New York underworld had become too "hot" for him at the moment, he chose to return to the Caribbean, but vowed someday to come back and finish off Spider-Girl. He is later revealed to be the instigator of a mob war against the Black Tarantula, returning to New York to finish the job. He defeated American Dream and the New Warriors. He then dropped them from a great height, planning to kill Spider-Girl as she tried to save them. However, he himself was then killed by Mayhem, Spider-Girl's half-symbiote clone.

Ultimate Marvel

The Ultimate Marvel equivalent of Hobgoblin is Harold "Harry" Osborn when his second personality Shaw takes control.

Sword-and-sorcery
In the 2007 Spider-Man/Red Sonja mini-series, the Hobgoblin was one of several supervillains who was transformed into a sword-and-sorcery version of themselves due to the spell cast by Kulan Gath. It was never specified which Hobgoblin it was.

Spider-Verse

Overwhelmed with rage over the death of Gwen Stacy, the Earth-21205 version of Peter Parker, as Spider-Man, murdered the Green Goblin and later retired his Spider-Man identity. He soon after became "the Goblin", a villain similar in costume to the Hobgoblin. This character was later targeted by Verna of the Inheritors (alongside the Hounds Scorpion and Rhino) as a Spider-Totem. The Spider-Woman of Earth-65 attempted to recruit him into a growing army of Spiders to protect him from the Inheritors, but he initially turned the offer down. When Spider-Woman revealed herself to be an alternate version of Gwen, he sacrificed himself to save her as atonement for failing to do so in his own dimension.

The Earth-001 version of Hobgoblin appeared as a member of Verna's Hounds alongside the multiple Green Goblins. Hobgoblin and the other goblin-themed Hounds attacked Silk, Spider-Woman of Earth-65, and Black Widow of Earth-1610. He is killed by Superior Spider-Man, Assassin Spider-Man, and Spider-Punk.

Spider-Gwen
In the alternate continuity of Spider-Gwen, the Green Goblin uses an army of Hobgoblin-based androids to assist him during his assault against Spider-Woman.

Spider-Geddon
In the Spider-Geddon event on Earth-11580, a version of Hobgoblin is seen alongside Green Goblin, Jack O'Lantern and Demogoblin during the Goblin Night. Under the orders of the Goblin Queen, they try to kill Gwen Stacy, but Spiders-Man arrives and defeats the Goblins.

Newspaper strip
In "The Amazing Spider-Man" newspaper strip by Stan Lee and Larry Lieber, Harry Osborn as the Hobgoblin has repeatedly attacked Spider-Man, seeking vengeance for his father's death. After trying to kill both Spider-Man and Black Widow after, under hypnotic influence of psychiatrist "Dr. Stone" (actually spy-assassin Dimitri Gregorin who has killed friends of the Black Widow in the past), Harry, seeing Spider-Man's heroism, realizes that Spider-Man is a hero, his father was a murderer, and vows to never assume the Hobgoblin identity again.

Reception
In 2009, an IGN list of the top 100 comic book villains ranked the Roderick Kingsley incarnation of Hobgoblin as the 57th best.

In other media

Television

 An amalgamated incarnation of the Hobgoblin named Jason Philips (full name Jason Philip Macendale) appears in Spider-Man: The Animated Series, voiced by Mark Hamill. Debuting in his self-titled, two-part episode, the Hobgoblin is provided with an arsenal of weapons by Norman Osborn to assassinate Wilson Fisk. He instead manipulates and betrays both Osborn and Fisk to take the latter's place as New York City's "Kingpin of Crime", but his plan is foiled by Spider-Man. In "The Mutant Agenda" and "Mutants' Revenge", the Hobgoblin learns of Dr. Herbert Landon's plan to exterminate mutants and uses this information to extort money from him. He comes into conflict with Spider-Man and the X-Men and escapes after turning Landon into a mutant for attempting to double-cross him. In "Rocket Racer", Philips begins dating Felicia Hardy. In "The Spot" and "Goblin War!", Philips becomes engaged to Hardy and, as the Hobgoblin, forms an uneasy alliance with the Kingpin and clashes with both Spider-Man and the Green Goblin over a time dilation accelerator. He is arrested soon after Felicia discovers his true identity. In the two-part series finale "I Really, Really Hate Clones", an alternate reality version of the Hobgoblin appears as an enemy of the Scarlet Spider.
 The Hobgoblin was set to appear in The Spectacular Spider-Man before the series was cancelled. Despite this, an African-American depiction of Roderick Kingsley appears in the episode "Accomplices".
 The Harry Osborn incarnation of the Hobgoblin appears in Spider-Man (2017), voiced by Max Mittelman. This version possesses Phil Urich's flaming energy sword and sonic scream. Additionally, Norman Osborn briefly dons Hobgoblin gear while trying to kill Spider-Man.
 The Roderick Kingsley incarnation of the Hobgoblin appears in Marvel Super Hero Adventures, voiced by Andrew Francis.

Film 
Sam Raimi confirmed in the director's commentary for his film Spider-Man 3 that the Hobgoblin identity was referred to on set, with a gold and silver Hobgoblin mask set next to Norman Osborn's Green Goblin mask and Harry Osborn's New Goblin mask in their secret lab.

Video games
 The Ned Leeds incarnation of the Hobgoblin appears in Spider-Man and Captain America in Doctor Doom's Revenge.
 The Ned Leeds incarnation of the Hobgoblin appears as a boss in The Amazing Spider-Man.
 The Ned Leeds incarnation of the Hobgoblin appears in Spider-Man: The Video Game, voiced by David Hadinger.
 The Jason Macendale incarnation of the Hobgoblin appears in Spider-Man vs. The Kingpin.
 The Ned Leeds incarnation of the Hobgoblin appears as a boss in The Amazing Spider-Man 2.
 The Jason Macendale incarnation of the Hobgoblin appears as a boss in Spider-Man: Return of the Sinister Six.
 The Roderick Kingsley incarnation of the Hobgoblin appears as an assist character in the PSP and PS2 versions of Spider-Man: Web of Shadows.
 The Roderick Kingsley incarnation of the Hobgoblin appears as an alternate costume for the Green Goblin in Marvel: Ultimate Alliance 2.
 An exclusive Marvel 2099 incarnation of the Hobgoblin appears in Spider-Man: Shattered Dimensions, voiced by Steve Blum. This version is a mercenary hired by Alchemax with nanofiber/bio-organic circuitry wings bonded to his back and "psy-powers". After obtaining a fragment of the Tablet of Order and Chaos, the Hobgoblin ambushes Spider-Man 2099 and has the web-slinger pursue him as he wreaks havoc. After Spider-Man corners him, the Hobgoblin uses the fragment to increase his psy-powers and torment the web-slinger with a hellish hallucination of gargoyle-like monsters. Ultimately, Spider-Man defeats the Hobgoblin and retrieves his tablet fragment before examining his wings and deducing Alchemax's involvement.
 The Roderick Kingsley and Ned Leeds incarnations of the Hobgoblin appear as playable characters in Lego Marvel Super Heroes 2.
 The Earth-21205 version of Peter Parker / Hobgoblin appears as a playable character in Spider-Man Unlimited.

Merchandise
 The Hobgoblin received an action figure in Mattel's Secret Wars toy line.
 The Hobgoblin received five figures in the Spider-Man: The Animated Series tie-in toyline.
 The Jason Macendale and Roderick Kingsley incarnations of the Hobgoblin received figures in series 2 and 17 of the Spider-Man Classics line respectively.
 The Hobgoblin received a figure in the Marvel Minimates line as part of a FYE, Suncoast, and Sam Goody-exclusive two-pack alongside a Scarlet Spider figure.
 The Roderick Kingsley incarnation of the Hobgoblin received a bust from Bowen Designs.
 The Roderick Kingsley incarnation of the Hobgoblin received a bust in Hasbro's Marvel Universe toyline.
 The Phil Urich incarnation of the Hobgoblin received a figure in the Heroclix line.
 The Hobgoblin served as a Build-a-Figure for the Marvel Legends Infinite Series Spider-Man line.
 The Hobgoblin received a minifigure in the Spider-Man: Ghost Rider Team-up Lego set.

Miscellaneous
The Ned Leeds incarnation of the Hobgoblin appears in the Islands of Adventure ride The Amazing Adventures of Spider-Man, voiced by Pat Fraley.

Notes

References

External links
 Hobgoblin I at Marvel.com

 SpideyKicksButt.com: "Squandered Legacy: The Rise and Fall of the Hobgoblin"
 Peter David site: "Foolish Consistencies and..."

 
Articles about multiple fictional characters
Villains in animated television series
Characters created by John Romita Jr.
Characters created by John Romita Sr.
Characters created by Roger Stern
Comics characters introduced in 1983
Fictional characters from New York City
Fictional mass murderers
Marvel Comics characters with superhuman strength
Marvel Comics mutates
Spider-Man characters code names
Video game bosses